Haiti Reads is a small nonprofit literacy organization based in the United States that provides educational support to communities in Haiti. Founded in 2007 by Jeanette Alfred, it is located in Chicago, Illinois, and currently has volunteer clusters in San Diego, California; Chicago, Illinois; and Port-au-Prince, Haiti.

Its mission is to make books accessible to children and adults in Haiti, regardless of their education or financial status, as well as to establish centers throughout the country that house educational resources for teachers and provide adequate instructional training. In addition to preparing teachers, Haiti Reads aims to provide training to underserved people in the community.

Offering books in various languages including Haitian Creole and French, Haiti Reads once owned and operated Bibliyotèk 54, a community library (in Carrefour Quest, Port-au-Prince, Haiti). The library was originally located in Delmas 24 until 2009, but relocated after the January 2010 earthquake when the building was damaged. The library then moved to a few other locations, and, most recently, shared the building with a computer training school with the permission of the owner. Unfortunately, the owner lost the use of his building due to a property dispute within his family, and Haiti Reads no longer operates Bibliyotèk 54.

Instead, the entire collection of Haiti Reads books can now be found in several schools throughout the Port-au-Prince area, including: Ecole de la Saint Famille - Ecole Elementaire, rue Chavannes, Petionville; Ecole de la Saint Famille - Ecole Secondaire, rue Chavannes, Petionville; Agape PAP Missionary Mail Center Library, Delmas 79, Delmas; College de la Restauration Educative (CRED), Rte de Desca, Te Sale, Cabaret; Ecole Fils Aime - Ecole Elementaire, Guitton de Cabaret; Ecole Fils Aime - College Secondaire, Guitton de Cabaret; Alexander and Myrtle Chabot Memorial Library, Holiness Mission, Petionville; Institution Mixte la Bergenrie du Savoir (IMBS), Rue Stenio Vincent, Petionville; and Ecole Professionel Odrere Sanon, rue Stenio Vincent, Petionville.

Current members of their volunteer staff include: Jeanette Alfred, Founder and President; Bobbi Weaver, Vice-President and Library Consultant; Gerald Alfred, Music Teacher and Coordinator for Kicks for Haiti; Jean Baptiste Franzy, Volunteer and Owner/Directeur Haiti Service Peinture; Jean Erik, Volunteer; Zaza Francois, Kash-Kash Gallery Supervisor/Owner; and Peter Dalce, Owner/Director of Zola Tech.

My Dog Lucy is the first published book by Jeanette Alfred, with proceeds going to Haiti Reads.

Programs 
Alongside supplying books to the community in which the library is located, Haiti Reads also provides CPR instruction and offers resources to learn Haitian Creole.

References

External links 
 
Facebook page

Foreign charities operating in Haiti
Non-profit organizations based in Chicago
Organizations promoting literacy